Peter John Squires  (born 1936), is a male former diver who competed for England.

Diving career
He represented Great Britain in the Diving at the 1960 Summer Olympics.

He represented England in the 3 metres springboard at the 1958 British Empire and Commonwealth Games in Cardiff, Wales.

He was associated to the Highgate Diving Club.

References

1936 births
English male divers
Divers at the 1958 British Empire and Commonwealth Games
Olympic divers of Great Britain
Divers at the 1960 Summer Olympics
Living people
Commonwealth Games competitors for England